The John A. O'Farrell Cabin was built by John A. O'Farrell in Boise, Idaho, in 1863. The cabin is considered the first family home in Boise.

History
The  cabin was built of cottonwood logs near the entrance to the reconstructed Fort Boise in 1863, and it precedes the original plat of Boise City. O'Farrell made improvements to the cabin in 1864, including glass windows, a hinged door, and a shingle roof. Catholic services were held at the cabin from 1863 until 1870, and the O'Farrells lived in the cabin until 1872.

In 1910 the cabin was moved  to its current location, and it became the property of the Daughters of the American Revolution. The DAR restored the cabin in 1911. In 1958 a protective cover was added, then in 1993 the cabin became the property of Boise Parks and Recreation, and it was restored again in 2002. 

The cabin was listed on the National Register of Historic Places December 3, 1999.

References

short story about the O'Farrell cabin:  "Thing with feathers that perches in the soul"  by Anthony Doerr  pages 235 to 244 in anthology = 2016 Pushcart Prize XL / Best of the Small Presses edited by Bill Henderson

See also
Timeline of Boise, Idaho
John A. O'Farrell House

External links

Houses in Ada County, Idaho
Buildings and structures in Boise, Idaho
National Register of Historic Places in Ada County, Idaho